Kirsten Idebøen (26 February 1963 – 20 May 2015) was a Norwegian banker.

She held an MBA in finance from the George Washington University.

In July 2000, she became the CEO of the Halogen Norway, a strategic Internet solutions company.

Kirsten Idebøen became the chief financial officer of the group SpareBank 1 in 2002, and chief executive officer from 28 January 2009 to 1 April 2015.

She was also a board member of Finansbanken, Berner Gruppen, the Norwegian Financial Services Association, Elkem, Schibsted, A-pressen and Budstikka Media.

On 1 April 2015, she resigned from the position of CEO of the SpareBank 1 Group. On 30 April 2015, the shareholders approved her appointment as Director of the board of the reinsurance company SCOR SE.

Kirsten Idebøen died on 20 May 2015 at the age of 52.

Personal life 

Kirsten Idebøen was married to Knut Idebøen. They had two sons. One died in 2014, a few months before his mother.

References

1963 births
2015 deaths
People from Bærum
Norwegian chief executives
Norwegian bankers
Norwegian women business executives
Women chief financial officers
Women chief executives
Norwegian corporate directors
Women corporate directors
Women bankers
21st-century Norwegian businesswomen
21st-century Norwegian businesspeople